James David Stephenson (October 22, 1925 – July 19, 1975) was a guard in the National Football League. He was drafted in the fifteenth round of the 1950 NFL Draft by the Los Angeles Rams and played that season with the team. The next five seasons he would play with the Green Bay Packers.

References

1925 births
1975 deaths
American football offensive guards
Los Angeles Rams players
Green Bay Packers players
West Virginia Mountaineers football players
Players of American football from West Virginia
People from Clendenin, West Virginia